Vishesh Bhatt is an Indian filmmaker who works in Hindi cinema.

Career
He studied filmmaking at the Tisch School of Arts, NYU & USC. Currently at age 32, he heads strategy, content development, creatives, marketing, and is responsible for all digital initiatives (including one of the first and largest online partnerships with Amazon) at Vishesh Films.

In his capacity as a writer, filmmaker and producer, Vishesh has created several blockbuster franchises with fresh talent. At the age of 21, he wrote and produced "Jannat", the first film on the dark side of India's most revered sport, cricket, which went on to become a huge blockbuster and a big franchise. He also directed for the superhit franchise Murder at age 27, which was selected for several local awards and the Shanghai Film Festival. He was recently invited to Harvard Business School to speak on the changing landscape of Bollywood & Bollywood beyond India.

References

Film directors from Mumbai
Living people
Vishesh
Year of birth missing (living people)